Barun Valley is a Himalayan valley situated at the base of Mt. Makalu in the Sankhuwasabha district of Nepal. This valley rests entirely inside the Makalu Barun National Park.

The Barun Valley provides stunning contrasts, where high waterfalls cascade into deep gorges, craggy rocks rise from lush green forests, and colourful flowers bloom beneath white snow peaks. This unique landscape shelters some of the last pristine mountain ecosystems on earth. Rare species of animals and plants flourish in diverse climates and habitats, relatively undisturbed by humankind.

History
The valley was created by the Barun River which becomes a glacier in winter. The river is known as Chukchuwa in the local Limbu language. The study has shown that this place was originally inhabited by Yakkha and Limbu centuries ago.

Beyul
In the ancient religious Buddhist books, seven Beyul ( Nghe-Beyul Khimpalung) situated in the Himalayan region are described as mystical and spectacularly beautiful evergreen places where no one gets old. It is told that, in case of great cataclysm, life will remain only in these seven areas of the world. In those books, one of the Beyul is mentioned to be situated somewhere at this Makalu-Barun region.

Places

All of this valley is uninhabited. It is mostly covered by grassland (Kharka). In the summer, some temporary camps are made. Listed below are the names of these camping regions.
Mumbuk
Yangle Kharka
Nghe
Ripuk
Tadaso
Yak Kharka
Langmale
Shershon

Flora and fauna
The Barun Valley climbs from Eastern Himalayan broadleaf forests at low elevations through Eastern Himalayan subalpine conifer forests and into Eastern Himalayan alpine shrub and meadows.

Recognized for its tremendous diversity of plants, animals, and people, the area contains over 3,000 species of flowering plants, including 25 species of rhododendron, 47 types of orchids, and 56 rare plants. 440 species of birds, and 75 species of mammals, including the endangered clouded leopard (snow leopard), red panda, musk deer, wild boar, have been recorded.

This remarkable biodiversity is considered to be of global significance and provides a living laboratory for international scientific research. The Barun Valley is part of a huge international protected area under an agreement between Nepal and China.

Plants like Swertia Barunensis (4200m) and Potentilla Makaluensis (4000 m) nomenclature under the name of river Barun and Mt. Makalu are found only in this area in the entire world. 87 Himalayan medical herbs including Yasrha Gumba  and Panch Aule are found here. Panch Aule is a fingered root plant (five fingers max) where fingers indicate the age of the plant in a year.

The trek 

This valley lies along the trekking route to Makalu Base Camp. This somewhat difficult yet extremely rewarding trek offers a true wilderness experience in the rugged uninhabited terrain of Makalu-Barun National Park. These days there are lodges above Tashigaon till the Base Camp, so one does not need to take camping gear, food and fuel further on. However, the lodges may not have enough blankets for visitors, so it is advisable to take a sleeping bag along. The use of a local guide is strongly recommended, as the trails are difficult to follow in some places.

Other Attractions

Shiva Dhara
This domelike cave,  about 500 feet high, has a large waterfall coming out of its stone roof. The waterfall is considered a sacred tap of Lord Shiva. To get to this place one has to climb an extremely dangerous cliff with the help of locals, which will take about three to four hours.

Tadasho
This is a large stone cliff which has a hole in its face, and through which a waterfall cascades. Local legend has it that a dark lake lay atop the cliff, which mysteriously caused the deaths of many Tibetan refugees after nightfall. A Buddhist monk by the name of Rinpoche broke the cliff with his Tadasho, in order to destroy the lake and save the lives of the  Tibetan refugees.

See also
Makalu
Makalu Barun National Park

References

External links
 Makalu Barun National Park and Conservation Area (Government of Nepal)
 Down to Barun Valley - Travel log
makalu base camp trek

Valleys of Nepal
Geography of Koshi Province